Prasanna Kumar Bezawada (born 16 January 1985) is an Indian screenwriter and lyricist who works in Telugu films. He is known for writing films like Cinema Choopistha Mava, Naanna Nenu Naa Boyfriends, Nenu Local, Hello Guru Prema Kosame and Dhamaka.

Early life
Prasanna Kumar was born in Hyderabad on 16 June 1985. He was married to Mounika on 29 July 2020 and they had a son.

Filmography

References

External links 
 

Living people
1985 births
Indian male screenwriters
Telugu-language lyricists
Indian lyricists